The Wanderpreiss Cup was a cup contested by Grêmio and Fussball Club Porto Alegre. The cup was sponsored by Banco Alemão, a Brazilian bank. It was granted to the club which won three consecutive matches. The matches were disputed every six months. Grêmio FBPA was the only club to win the Wanderpreiss Cup three consecutive times.

List of champions

Defunct football cup competitions in Brazil